Raivo Trass (12 March 1946 – 7 June 2022) was an Estonian actor, director and theatrical pedagogue.

Career
Trass graduated from the Tallinn State Conservatory's Performing Arts Department in 1968. From 1968 until 1977, he was an actor at Estonian Drama Theatre. From 1977 until 1985, he was the chief stage manager of the Rakvere Theatre. From 1981 until 1985, he was the head of Rakvere Theatre. From 1985 until 1992, he was a director at Estonian Drama Theatre. From 1997 until 2004, he was the chief stage manager of Endla Theatre.

Trass' first big movie role was Hans von Risbieter in the Estonian classic Viimne reliikvia (The Last Relic) in 1969. Trass also appeared in Zaza Urushadze's Tangerines (2013), Anders Thomas Jensen's Riders of Justice (2020), and Taneli Mustonen's The Twin (2022).

Awards
 1975: Ants Lauter Prize
 1983: Meritorious Artist of the Estonian SSR
 2001: Order of the White Star, IV class.

Selected filmography
 1969: Viimne reliikvia – Hans von Risbieter
 1982: Arabella, mereröövli tütar – Manuel
 1991: Vana mees tahab koju – Albert Valter
 1991: Surmatants – Diederek von Katwijk
 1999: Kass kukub käppadele – Ernesto 
 2006: Vana daami visiit – Linnapea
 2010: Riigimehed – 
 2012: Vasaku jala reede – Veteran
 2013: Mandariinid – Juhan
 2018: Tuliliilia – Heimar
 2020: Riders of Justice – Orthodox priest
 2022: The Twin – Old Man
 2022: Apteeker Melchior. Viirastus – Goswin

References

External links

1946 births
2022 deaths
Estonian male stage actors
Estonian male film actors
Estonian male television actors
20th-century Estonian male actors
21st-century Estonian male actors
Estonian theatre directors
Recipients of the Order of the White Star, 4th Class
Estonian Academy of Music and Theatre alumni
People from Lääneranna Parish